is a role-playing video game developed and published by Konami for the PlayStation video game console and the second installment of the Suikoden video game series. It was released in late 1998 in Japan, 1999 in North America, and in 2000 in Europe. The game features a vast array of characters, with over 100 recruitable characters, of which over 40 are usable in combat.

Suikoden II takes place 3 years after the events of the original Suikoden and centers on an invasion of the City-States of Jowston by the Kingdom of Highland. The player controls a silent protagonist who is the adopted son of Genkaku, a hero who saved the City-States of Jowston in a war against Highland years ago. The protagonist and his best friend, Jowy Atreides, each gain one half of the Rune of the Beginning, one of the 27 True Runes of the Suikoden setting, and become caught up in the intrigues of the invasion and the dark fate of those who bear the halves of that Rune. As with other Suikoden titles, the game also centers on the recruitment of the 108 Stars of Destiny, who together have the power to alter fate.

The game was initially released to lackluster sales and somewhat tepid critical reception, with some criticism (and lack of widespread appeal) being directed at the game's simpler and more retro 16-bit sprite visuals at a time when 3D graphics were heavily emphasized across the industry. Since, the game has become a cult classic, in retrospect being cited as a classic of the role-playing genre and one of the greatest video games of all time.

A remastered version along with a predecessor of the game, Suikoden I and II HD Remaster: Gate Rune and Dunan Unification Wars, is scheduled to release for Microsoft Windows, Nintendo Switch, PlayStation 4 and Xbox One in 2023.

Gameplay
Suikoden II is a role-playing video game with strategic elements, with multiple gameplay formats ranging from one-on-one combat to large scale confrontations between two armies. The player controls a silent protagonist, advancing the plot by completing tasks and talking with other characters. The player can also recruit over 100 new characters to his cause, often involving a short sidequest to do so. In towns, the player can gather information, sharpen characters' weaponry, and buy equipment and runes; wilderness areas generally feature random encounters with monsters.

Like other games of the series, Suikoden II employs a unique character leveling system from most RPGs. There is a fixed amount of experience points needed to gain each level, and experience gained after battles is determined by the difference in levels between the party members and enemies. This allows for low-level characters to catch up to the levels of enemies at later points in the game quickly, and reduce the need for level grinding.

Runes, the source of all magic in the world of Suikoden II, are handled the same as the original Suikoden. Characters have a certain number of spell usages per "spell level"; for instance, a character with four level 1 spell slots and a Fire Rune could cast "Flaming Arrows" (the level 1 Fire Rune spell) four times. Some specialized runes or skill-based runes have different rules, such as unlimited use or a single use per battle.

Updates from the original Suikoden include a grid and unit based tactical battle system, the addition of a three rune slot system which allows for three different runes to be equipped at once, a party inventory system, a "dash" button that allowed the player to move around the screen quicker, and vast graphical improvement. Also notable is the inclusion of a variety of mini-games including one quite reminiscent of Iron Chef. A transfer of data from the prior game in the series enables returning characters to enter the fray with higher levels and improved weapons. References to the original Suikoden are also adapted accordingly for a greater feel in continuity.

Following the original Suikoden, Suikoden II contains three different types of combat:

Regular battles: Where the majority of combat takes place in the game, the turn-based battle system in Suikoden II is considered typical of JRPGs at the time, containing options for attack, magic (runes), items etc. The player can enter battles through random encounters on the world map and dungeons, or at specific points of the plot. The player may have a party of up to 6 characters in this battle type, against up to 6 enemies. If all six characters lose all their hit points and are thus incapacitated, it is game over and the player must restart (exceptions exist for certain plot battles in which winning is optional). This is the only type of combat where the player can gain experience, items or Potch (the currency of Suikoden II). Emphasis is placed on "unite attacks," unique combination attacks between specific characters in the party. These special attacks exhibit a wide variety of abilities and usually highlight the personality traits and relationships of the characters.
Duels: The main character is pitted against another character in single combat. This style of fighting only has three moves: Attack, Wild Attack, and Defend. This duel is played in a Rock, Paper, Scissors style where "Attack" beats "Defend", "Wild Attack" beats "Attack", and "Defend" beats "Wild Attack". The player must attempt to guess what kind of attack the enemy is going to perform by the dialogue displayed on-screen before each round.
Massive battles: More interactivity was added to this element of the gameplay over that of its predecessor. While some of the shades of the old  "Rock, Paper, Scissors" style battle of the original (where cavalry beats archers, archers beat magic and magic beats cavalry) remain, Suikoden II introduces a grid style battle system reminiscent to that of the Romance of the Three Kingdoms or Fire Emblem games. As the main character recruits characters for his castle, this opens up more options for more units. Certain characters are 'unit leaders' while others are 'supports'. Every character adds a certain amount of defense or attack to a unit. In addition, certain characters also add special abilities to the unit to which they have been attached. The numbers affect the chances of win or loss as much as the type of units being pitted against each other. Every unit may take up to a total of two 'losses' which are counted when a unit suffers a severe number of casualties. Each skirmish they take part in might result in no loss, loss on one side, or even loss on both sides. As mentioned before, certain characters add special abilities to the units. Examples of these abilities include being able to take more losses than usual, magic or archery to allow attacks from a distance, healing of itself or others, etc. When a unit suffers its maximum losses it will retreat from battle and, when this happens there is a possibility of the characters in the unit being wounded or even killed. Should a character be killed in a massive battle, they are considered permanently dead.

Story

Characters

The story of Suikoden II centers around the protagonist, Riou (any name can be chosen by the player),, his childhood best friend Jowy Atreides, and his adopted sister Nanami. The story revolves around Riou and Jowy each acquiring one half of the Rune of the Beginning, one of the 27 True Runes that each govern an aspect of the Suikoden universe and are the source of all magical powers. The Rune, whose name references the creation myth of the Suikoden universe, governs conflict and war, and steers the destinies of Riou and Jowy so they must fight each other until one is defeated and the two halves are reunited. Their fated conflict causes much pain for Nanami, who wishes for the three friends to run away and live a quiet and happy life together.

The main conflict of the story centers on a war between the nations of Highland and the City-States of Jowston. The antagonist for the majority of the game is Luca Blight, heir to the throne of Highland. Luca is a brutal and bloodthirsty madman who developed a strong hatred for Jowston at a young age after witnessing his mother's rape by City-State soldiers during an earlier war.

As with all Suikoden games, the principal cast of the game is the 108 Stars of Destiny, who play important or minor roles in the plot of the game. Some prominent Stars of Destiny from the original Suikoden appear in Suikoden II and play key roles in the game, including Viktor and Flik. If the player loads save data from the original Suikoden at the beginning of the game, the protagonist of the previous game can be recruited.

Plot
The game begins with Riou and Jowy as members of the youth brigade of the Highland army. The bloodthirsty, maniacal Prince Luca Blight orchestrates the slaughter of the youth brigade under the false flag of the neighboring City-States of Jowston, giving the prince an excuse to justify an invasion. After promising to return to that spot if they are separated, Riou and Jowy escape the slaughter by jumping from a cliff into a river.

Riou is rescued from the river by a group of mercenaries working for Jowston, led by Viktor and Flik from the first Suikoden game, but is detained as an enemy soldier of Highland. Jowy is rescued by keepers of a mysterious shrine in a nearby town and is nursed back to health. Learning of Riou's imprisonment, Jowy rescues Riou and they escape back to their hometown in Highland. After reuniting with Nanami, the two are captured, accused of espionage, and sentenced to death by the Highland army to cover up the truth of the youth brigade massacre. They are saved by Viktor and Flik, and the three return to Jowston to fight against the invading Highland army. No match for Blight and the Highland army, they are forced to flee, and the Highland army razes the towns and villages in the region. Fleeing from the advancing Highland army, Riou and Jowy return to the now-destroyed town where Jowy was rescued, and are drawn to the mysterious shrine that is the resting place of the Rune of the Beginning. Entering the shrine, they each receive half of the Rune—the Bright Shield Rune and the Black Sword Rune—and continue to flee to the capital city of Jowston, Muse.

After arriving in Muse, Riou and Jowy are asked to participate in a spy mission to the Highland army camp, and while returning Jowy is captured by the enemy. Jowy is able to escape back to Muse but begins to act strangely after returning. Meanwhile, while trying to rally into battle against Highland, the individual leaders of the City-States collapse into petty bickering and infighting. As the Highland army approaches to attack Muse, however, Jowy murders the leader of Muse, Anabelle, and opens the city gates to let the Highland army in. Riou and Nanami, distraught over Jowy's betrayal, flee with the surviving members of Viktor's mercenary group south across Lake Dunan to regroup. 

After liberating a ruined castle on the lake shore from the vampire Neclord, the group uses the castle as a new base to build their forces against Highland. Leknaat, the magician and True Rune bearer from the original Suikoden who oversees fate, appears and tells Riou that he has been chosen to gather the 108 Stars of Destiny to alter the fate the True Runes impose on the world. Riou and the recruited Stars of Destiny work to rally the remaining City-States under the banner of the New State Army.

During this time, it is learned that Jowy had made a deal with Luca Blight while captured to be allowed to assist Highland in defeating the City-States, in exchange for helping Luca achieve his personal ambitions. Jowy rises through the ranks of the Highland army after capturing Greenhill without even a battle, marries Luca's sister Princess Jillia, and plots with Luca to murder the King of Highland. However, Jowy reveals to some trusted lieutenants within the Highland army that his support for Luca is a ruse, that he believes Luca's insanity and cruelty are a threat to both Highland and Jowston, and he intends to betray Luca after building his own base of support. After becoming King of Highland, Luca launches an attack against the New State Army. Jowy uses the pending attack to betray Luca by warning the New State Army and giving Riou information on Luca's whereabouts. Riou and the New State Army ambush Luca and he is killed. Jowy then becomes king of Highland through his marriage to Jillia.

However, after the fall of Luca Blight, Jowy is still not willing to make peace with Jowston, as he is convinced that a new nation controlling both Highland and Jowston is needed to prevent the horror of war. He urges Riou to surrender, but Riou also can't betray the trust of his followers, and the two are destined to continue fighting. After successfully freeing the occupied City-States from Highland control, the New State Army defeats the Highland army and invades the capital city, causing Jowy to flee. After entering the Highland royal castle, Riou learns that Jowy had been using his Black Sword Rune to suppress the power of the Beast Rune, another of the 27 True Runes kept in the castle that governs animalistic rage, passion, and blood sacrifice. Luca's bloodthirsty ruthlessness was thought to be aided by the Rune, and Luca had been sacrificing the lives of citizens of Jowston to awaken the Rune's power. After defeating the activated Beast Rune, Riou returns to the cliff from the beginning of the game, where Jowy is waiting for him. The two duel one final time, with Jowy, Nanami, and Riou's ultimate fate depending on the player's choices and whether the player had recruited all 108 Stars of Destiny.

Development and release
In the winter of 1993/1994, Konami newcomers Yoshitaka Murayama and Junko Kawano were tasked with creating an RPG for an internally developed video games console. This game was scrapped in the early stages of development and despite the popular belief was not the basis for the script of Suikoden. Murayama, Kawano and ten other employees were instead assigned with developing Konami's first games for Sony's upcoming console, the PlayStation. With the pick of making a baseball game, a racing game or an RPG, Murayama and Kawano decided to reopen their RPG project, although Murayama has stated that given the opportunity, he would have preferred to make a shoot 'em up, citing his preference for arcade action titles such as Taito's Metal Black. Committed from the start to make a franchise to rival series such as Enix's Dragon Quest and Square's Final Fantasy, Murayama wrote the scenario of the first Suikoden. With the success of the first game a sequel gained a green-light. After reading fan letters Murayama decided that the selling point of the first game was its story, and thus it became the main focus of the second title. The story for Suikoden 2 was conceived after Suikoden 1 and was mostly written by Murayama himself.
Konami later released Genso Suikoden I & II, a compilation of the first two games of the series, in 2005 on the PlayStation Portable. However, it was released only to the Japanese market. Suikoden II was made available for download on the PlayStation Network on December 9, 2014.

Reception

Suikoden II saw a limited print run, and the lackluster initial response prevented a reprinting of the game. Despite this, the game received "favorable" reviews according to the review aggregation website Metacritic. Francesca Reyes of Next Generation called it "One of the best RPGs to hit PlayStation this year."

Since the 2010s, reanalysis of the game is often met with critical praise, and many video game critics and players alike consider it to be one of the best Konami games as well as one of the best console RPGs from outside of the Square-Enix canon, and the best of all Suikoden games.

See also 

 List of video games considered the best

References

External links

Konami's Official Genso Suikoden website 

1998 video games
Konami games
Nintendo Switch games
PlayStation (console) games
PlayStation 4 games
Role-playing video games
Suikoden
Video games about revenge
Video games developed in Japan
Video games scored by Miki Higashino
Video games with alternate endings
Windows games
Xbox One games
Single-player video games